Donington School F.C. was an English football club, based in Donington, Lincolnshire. The club represented the Donington Grammar School, and entered in the first ever FA Cup in 1871–72 but did not compete in a match.

The idea of entering a team into the 1871–72 FA Cup was supposedly concocted as a way of increasing the pupils' physical fitness. Having been drawn against Queen's Park of Glasgow in the first round, the two teams could not agree on a date for the match, and both  were allowed to progress. However, the two teams were again drawn together in round two, and in this instance Donington School withdrew, rather than face the cost (around £2 per student) and time of the trip to Scotland.

The club did not enter the FA Cup again and in 1949 the school was renamed the Thomas Cowley School. A team of ex-pupils played an exhibition match in Glasgow against Queen's Park in May 1972, as part of the Football Association's centenary celebrations. The match was won 6–0 by Queen's Park.

References

Defunct football clubs in England
Defunct football clubs in Lincolnshire
1871–72 in English football
Association football clubs established in the 19th century